The Civilian Board of Contract Appeals (CBCA) is an Article I court that was established under the Contract Disputes Act of 1978 as an independent tribunal to hear and decide contract disputes between Government contractors and the General Services Administration (GSA) and other civilian Executive agencies of the United States.

Jurisdiction
The Civilian Board of Contract Appeals decides disputes between Government contractors and Executive agencies of the United States. The Board's authority extends to all Executive agencies other than the Department of Defense, the National Aeronautics and Space Administration, the United States Postal Service, the Postal Regulatory Commission, the Federal Aviation Administration ((d)(4)), and the Tennessee Valley Authority.

Its original jurisdiction over claims involving Government contract disputes partially overlaps as concurrent jurisdiction with the United States Court of Federal Claims under the Contract Disputes Act of 1978,  and the "Big" Tucker Act, but not the United States district courts for claims less than $10,000 under the "Little" Tucker Act ((a)(2)). The United States Court of Appeals for the Federal Circuit may exercise appellate jurisdiction over decisions of the Board involving Government contract disputes ( and (a)(1)).

The Board also hears and decides various additional classes of cases, including:

Cases arising under the Indian Self-Determination Act,  et seq.;
Disputes between insurance companies and the U.S. Department of Agriculture's Risk Management Agency involving actions of the Federal Crop Insurance Corporation under  et seq.;
Claims by Federal employees under  for reimbursement of expenses incurred while on official temporary duty travel or in connection with relocation to a new duty station;
Claims by carriers or freight forwarders under (i)(1) involving actions of the General Services Administration regarding payment for transportation services;
Claims under the Federal Emergency Management Agency's Public Assistance Grant Program funding resulting from damages incurred by Hurricanes Katrina and Rita; and
Claims for the proceeds of the sale of property of certain Federal civilian employees who are dead, ill, or missing under .

Procedure
The Board uses a variety of techniques intended to shorten and simplify, when appropriate, the formal proceedings normally used to resolve contract disputes. The Board fully supports the use of alternative dispute resolution (ADR) in all appropriate cases; it encourages the prompt, expert, and inexpensive resolution of contract disputes as promoted by the Administrative Dispute Resolution Act. In addition, the Board provides to other Executive agencies, when jointly requested by an agency and its contractor, alternative dispute resolution services on contract-related matters, whether arising before or after a contract has been awarded.

History
The Civilian Board of Contract Appeals was established by Section 847 of the National Defense Authorization Act for Fiscal Year 2006, with an effective date of January 6, 2007, to hear and decide contract disputes between Government contractors and Executive agencies under the provisions of the Contract Disputes Act of 1978, and regulations and rules issued under that statute.  The Civilian Board of Contract Appeals was created by consolidating eight former boards of contract appeals:

General Services Administration Board of Contract Appeals (GSBCA)
Department of Transportation Board of Contract Appeals (DOTBCA)
Department of Agriculture Board of Contract Appeals (AGBCA)
Department of Veterans Affairs Board of Contract Appeals (VABCA)
Department of the Interior Board of Contract Appeals (IBCA)
Department of Energy Board of Contract Appeals (EBCA)
Department of Housing and Urban Development Board of Contract Appeals (HUDBCA)
Department of Labor Board of Contract Appeals (LBCA)

See also
 Contract Disputes Act of 1978
 Tucker Act
 Armed Services Board of Contract Appeals
 United States Court of Federal Claims
 United States Court of Appeals for the Federal Circuit

References

External links
 

Contract
General Services Administration
Government procurement in the United States
2007 establishments in the United States
Courts and tribunals established in 2007